Graham Eric Reynolds (born March 5, 1971) is an American composer, bandleader and improviser. Based in Austin, Texas, he holds a Creative Capital Award, an Independent Music Award, two Frederick R. Loewe Music Theatre Awards, nine Austin Critics Table Awards, the John Bustin Award, multiple Austin Chronicle Best Composer wins and a B. Iden Payne Award.

Golden Arm Trio
Reynolds’ regular performance and recording vehicle, Golden Arm Trio, is a band in name only, featuring Reynolds as the only consistent member. Golden Arm Trio has performed all over the US and has released three CDs, in addition to featuring on the soundtrack of the Warner Brothers’ film A Scanner Darkly.

Golden Hornet
In the early 1990s, some of Reynolds's most personal works in the realm of concert music struggled to line up with the right spaces, presenters, and funding. Alongside Peter Stopschinski, another composer-bandleader that was a part of the burgeoning rock and punk scene of Austin, Reynolds began to apply the collective creation and self-production methods of the rock scene to the world of classical music. Golden Hornet formed, starting with Six Pieces for String Quartet (1999), performed by Tosca String Quartet. Collaborations with Austin Lyric Opera, Glenn Kotche, local high school orchestras, and many others followed, ranging from percussion pieces to Shostakovich. Reynolds and Stopschinski produced, curated, and commissioned all of the works, including Mozart Requiem Undead (2014), resulting in over 150 artists performing, with contributions from DJ Spooky, Pulitzer Prize winning composer Caroline Shaw, and many others.

In 2008, Golden Hornet received official 501(c)3 designation and has since grown in capacity, as well as become more clarified in mission: one of commissioning new music, fostering young and emerging composers, and presenting adventurous works in non-traditional settings.

Reynolds continues as Golden Hornet's Artistic Director today. The organization has reached over 1500 audience members, contracted over eighteen local musicians, commissioned work from seven celebrated composers, and fostered the commissioning of five new works. Upcoming endeavor The Sound of Science, features works from the likes of Paola Prestini, Yuka Honda, Maja S.K. Ratjke, Felipe Pérez Santiago, and Foday Musa Suso.

Compositions
Reynolds' output includes five symphonies, two operas, string quartets, and numerous chamber music pieces, in addition to the work with Golden Arm Trio and in film, dance, and theater.

Film
After many experimental shorts and several live scores for silent films, Reynolds's first feature film score was The Journeyman (2001), a grim, Sergio Leone-inspired western featuring Willie Nelson. His relationship with iconic independent film director Richard Linklater (Slacker, Dazed and Confused, School of Rock), started with a simple piano score for the documentary short, “Live from Shiva’s Dance Floor” in 2003. Not long after, Linklater asked Reynolds to score A Scanner Darkly (2006), which Linklater was adapting from the Philip K. Dick novel. Keanu Reeves, Robert Downey Jr., Woody Harrelson, and Winona Ryder starred in the rotoscoped film. The score, which featured acoustic instruments and electric guitar processed through computer effects, was declared “Best Soundtrack of the Decade” by Cinema Retro Magazine. Completing and releasing A Scanner Darkly changed Reynolds's life, propelling his musical career forward. A consistent number of collaborations with Linklater have followed: Bernie (2011) starring Jack Black, which required totally different music - hymns, strings, country; Up to Speed (2012), starring Speed Levitch and broadcast by Hulu; Before Midnight (2013), the third of Linklater's romantic trilogy featuring Julie Delpy and Ethan Hawke, which premiered at Sundance. Reynolds has also continued work with a variety of other collaborators apart from Linklater, including The Diplomat (2015) for HBO and Rooster Teeth's series Day 5 (2016-2017). Beyond his scoring work with major collaborators, Reynolds has composed and performed several live scores for silent films, including Battleship Potemkin(1925), Nosferatu (1922), Wings (1927), Metropolis (1927) and Alfred Hitchcock's The Lodger (1927).

Theater
Much in the same way as his collaborations in dance, Reynolds has narrowed in on two consistent key partners in theatre. While his theatre work began with lighting in high school, and expanded into various work throughout Austin, his first collaboration with Rude Mechanicals (Rude Mechs) was In The House of Moles (2000), a relationship which blossomed into his current company membership with them, since 2003. He composed the original score and designed sound for the Creative Capital Award Winning The Method Gun (2007), The Lincoln Center commission Stop Hitting Yourself (2014), and the Yale Repertory commission Field Guide (2017). In total, the relationship has resulted in ten complete works. Simultaneously, his relationship with Salvage Vanguard Theater also developed, from Cry Pitch Carrolls (1999), the first in a series of collaborations with Ruth Margraff, and The Intergalactic Nemesis (2000), which split off from the company and had nearly a decade of international touring, deepening the network and connections with presenters.

Dance
In the early stages of his career, Reynolds's work in the world of dance started with short experimental collaborations with the Ellen Bartel Dance Collective, which then grew into several projects with Andrea Ariel. He has since worked consistently with two key partners. With choreographer Stephen Mills of Ballet Austin, he has scored, through both recorded and live performance methods, six large scale works, including: Cult of Color, a collaboration with visual artist Trenton Doyle Hancock, Belle Redux, and Bounce, which toured through seventeen cities across China. His collaborations with Allison Orr of Forklift Danceworks started in 2009, with The Trash Project; the documentary directed by Andy Garrison following the project took the work national, while other projects, such as Play Ball Kyoto, have traveled internationally. Most recently, Reynolds provided live scoring for the MAP Award Winning, and NEA funded My Park, My Pool, My City series as well as Served, each building on Orr's socially-engaged practices. Music for dance is a realm of passion for Reynolds, resulting from the life-long influence of several of the Diaghilev commissioned ballets; works that lived beyond their initial intent but continue to tell a story.

Collaborations 
Reynolds has collaborated with different artists and filmmakers including Richard Linklater, Rooster Teeth, Ballet Austin, Forklift Danceworks, Rude Mechs, Salvage Vangard Theater, Dionysium and more.

Community work involvement 
Golden Hornet, City of Austin Music Commission, Austin Chamber Music Center

References

External links

Graham Reynolds Interview and Feature Article
Graham Reynolds' official site

1971 births
Living people
American classical pianists
American film score composers
American television composers
American musical theatre composers
American classical composers
Fire Records (UK) artists